Portimonense Sporting Clube is a Portuguese sports club based in Portimão. Founded on 14 August 1914, it is most notable for its professional football team, which currently plays in the Primeira Liga, the top flight of Portuguese football. It also fields various youth teams and a veterans team in football, as well as teams in basketball.

Located in Algarve's second largest city, its stadium, the Estádio Municipal de Portimão, has a capacity of 9,544 spectators after undergoing renovation in early 2011. The club has never won any major trophies, but it participated in the Primeira Liga for several seasons.

Portimonense's zenith was in the 1980s, a decade in which the club only played its football in the top division, also competing in the UEFA Cup in 1985–86. They have reached the semifinals of the Taça de Portugal three times, in 1983, 1987 and 1988.

History
Portimonense was a regular presence in the Portuguese first division, even finishing fifth in 1984–85 – highlights included 0–0 home draws against Benfica and Sporting Lisbon – which led to participation in the UEFA Cup in the 1985–86 season. The team were eliminated in the first round of that competition by FK Partizan of Yugoslavia.

In the 1990s and 2000s, however, the club primarily played in the Segunda Liga, while also having a brief spell in the third level. In 2009–10, Portimonense started with Angolan Lito Vidigal at the helm, but when he left for União de Leiria, former Sporting midfielder Litos took charge, and led the team to a final second place, behind S.C. Beira-Mar, thus returning it to the top flight after exactly 20 years of absence; substitute Wilson Eduardo scored the only goal away to U.D. Oliveirense to guarantee the promotion.

Midway through the 2010–11 campaign, Litos was fired due to bad results, as Portimonense eventually ranked second from bottom and was relegated back. The team met the same fate in the following season, even managing to rank in a worse position; however, after Varzim S.C. was not allowed to promote from division three due to financial irregularities, Portimonense was reinstated.

Portimonense won the 2016–17 LigaPro to return to the top flight after six years; the campaign was managed by Vítor Oliveira, who had begun his coaching career with the club three decades earlier and had won promotion for the fifth consecutive time. The team went down on the last day of the 2019–20 season, as competitors C.D. Tondela and Vitória de Setúbal also won their games, however, Portimonense remained in the division due to issues off the pitch at both Vitória de Setúbal and C.D. Aves meaning these two were relegated and the Algarve side would stay up.

Players

Current squad

Out on loan

League and cup history

A.  Best league classification finish in the club's history.
B.  Despite finishing in a position which would relegate the club to the third division, Portimonense were reinstated in the Liga de Honra due to Varzim not meeting the financial requirements to play in the league.
Last updated: 25 September 2014

Div. = Division; 1D = Portuguese League; 2H = Liga de Honra; 2DS/2D = Portuguese Second Division
Ti. = Tier; Pos. = Position; Pl = Match played; W = Win; D = Draw; L = Lost; GS = Goal scored; GA = Goal against; P = Points

Honours
LigaPro: 2016–17
Portuguese Second Division: 1978–79, 2000–01

Europe

Club officials
On 13 July 2011, Portimonense elected its body of officials, for a three-year term.
President: José Fernando Teixeira da Rocha
Deputy president: António Alexandre Soares Rocha da Silveira
Vice-presidents: Luís Manuel de Andrade Rodrigues Batalau, José Cândido Rebelo Rodrigues, Nuno Miguel Lopes da Silva, João Carlos Pinhota Martins Santana, Francisco José de Matos Viegas Gouveia Coutinho, Luís Carlos da Costa Paiva

Managerial history

Futsal

Portimonense has a futsal team that plays top tier futsal in the Liga Sport Zone.

Basketball

Portimonense has a basketball team that plays in the Proliga (Portugal) basketball league.

Supporters and rivalries
Portimonense has its own club song: "Portimonense, expoente algarvio". Unlike many other football clubs, the supporters own and operate Portimonense, although this is more common in Iberia than in much of Europe.

The club has rivalries with fellow Algarve clubs Farense and Olhanense.

References

External links
Official website 
Zerozero team profile

 
Football clubs in Portugal
Association football clubs established in 1914
1914 establishments in Portugal
Primeira Liga clubs
Liga Portugal 2 clubs
Sport in Algarve